Mustafa Hanxhiu (Tiranë 1840 - Istanbul 1915) or Mustafa Ali Ibrahimi was a 19th-century Albanian politician. He was one of the delegates of the Albanian Declaration of Independence, where he represented Durrës.

References

19th-century Albanian people
1915 deaths
1840 births
All-Albanian Congress delegates
People from Tirana